Odkhüügiin Tsetsentsengel (born 18 October 1999) is a Mongolian judoka.

He is the gold medallist of the 2021 Judo Grand Slam Abu Dhabi in the +100 kg category.

References

External links
 
 

1999 births
Living people
Mongolian male judoka
20th-century Mongolian people
21st-century Mongolian people